Thomas Edward Stanley II (May 1, 1917 in North Carolina – January 23, 2001 in Dallas, Texas) was a Dallas-based American architect. He is known for his modernist glass and steel designs for buildings such as 211 North Ervay (1958) with architect Wyatt C. Hedrick and the First National Bank Tower (1965) with architect George Dahl.  He is also known for his use of minimalist classical designs (often called New Formalism) for buildings such as the Sanger-Harris department store (1965) in Dallas, Texas and the Cambridge Tower (1965) in Austin, Texas.

List of works

 with Wyatt C. Hedrick
 1948, W.A. Taylor Company office and warehouse, Dallas, TX (as Hedrick, Stanley and Morey)
 1950-1963, Tarleton State College, Stephenville, TX
 1952, Corrigan Tower, Dallas
 1952, Fidelity Union Life Insurance Building, Dallas
 1954, Vaughn Building, Dallas
 1956, First National Bank and First National Auto Bank, Waco
 1956, Shady Oak Country Club building, Westworth, TX
 1957, Mr. and Mrs. Lee Armer residence, Fort Worth
 1957, Armour Plant, Additions and Alterations, Portland, OR
 1957, Central Christian Church, Church building, Fort Worth
 1957, Colorado and Southern Railway Company, freight and passenger depot, Boulder, CO
 1957, Gatesville School for Boys. Chapel, Gatesville, TX
 1957, H. and N.T. Motor and Freight Lines Inc. office and terminal building, Dallas
 1957, Dr. and Mrs. A.W. Hiller residence, Fort Worth
 1957, Jackson Chevrolet Co. sales and service buildings, Garland, TX
 1957, Texas and Pacific terminal warehouse, Relocation of cooling towers, Fort Worth
 1957, Municipal Buildings, Gainesville, TX
 1957, Mr. Elmer Perkins residence, Additions and alterations, Wichtia Falls, TX
 1957, Plumbers and Steamfitters Local #1 union headquarters, Dallas
 1957, Sudan I.S.D. Homemaking building, Sudan, TX
 1957, Tarrant County Youth Center, Fort Worth
 1957, Texas Highway Dept. district headquarters buildings, Paris, TX (as Hedrick, Stanley & Morey)
 1958, 211 North Ervay Building, Dallas
 1958, Dr. Platt Allen medical clinic, Weatherford, TX 
 1958, Casa Del Club, Ciudad Bolívar, Venezuela
 1958, Anson General Hospital, Additions, Anson, TX
 1958, Fort Worth and Denver City Railroad, Mechanical building, Fort Worth
 1958, Lewter Corp. cooling building and slaughtering facilities, Lubbock, TX
 1958, Jay's Supermarket, Gallup, NM
 1958, Methodist Student Center building, Stephenville, TX
 1958, Shippers Warehouse Co. warehouse and office, Dallas
 1958, Sol Dey Rey Farms (as Hedrick, Stanley and Lightfoot)
 1958, Texas National Guard, One unit armory, Weatherford, TX
 1958, Trinity Methodist Church Sanctuary, Fort Worth
 1959, Bank of Georgia Building, Atlanta, GA
 1959, Curtis Building – Akard St and Cedar Springs Rd, Dallas
 1959, Drilcheck Corp. office building, Additions and alterations, Dallas
 1959, Midwestern Baptist Theological Seminary dormitory building and married couples apartments, Kansas City, MO
 1959, Elementary school building, Wilmer, TX
 1964, Federal Office Building, Fort Worth (as Hedrick Stanley and Wilson) 
 Adolphus Tower, Dallas

 with George Dahl
 1962-1965, First National Bank Tower, Dallas

 as Thomas E. Stanley and Associates
 1962, El Tropicano Hotel, San Antonio
 1962, Oak Park Plaza Building, Welborn St. and Rawlins St., Dallas 
 1962, Phoenix Title and Trust Building (Transamerica Office Building), Tucson, Arizona               
 1963, Dallas North Regional Shopping Center
 1963, 1125 Grand Boulevard, Kansas City, MO
 1964, One Lee Park West, Dallas
 1965, Sanger-Harris department store
 1965, Cambridge Tower, Austin
 1965, Mayflower Building
 1965, Noel Page Building, Dallas
 1965, Shaw-Walker Building, Dallas
 1966, Bank of Dallas, Lemmon Street, Dallas
 1967, Malta Hilton Hotel, Malta
 1968, Carr P. Collins Center at Baylor University Medical Center
 1968, West Park Shopping Center, Lubbock
 1969, Gulf and Western Building
 1969, Union National Bank of Little Rock
 1970, Indiana National Bank, Indianapolis
 1970, Gulf and Western Building, New York City
 1970, Midland Building, Columbus, Ohio
 1970, Lover's Lane United Methodist Church, Dallas
 1971, 3131 Turtle Creek Building, Dallas 
 1971, Liberty, the Bank of Mid-America, Oklahoma City
 1975, 30 North LaSalle, Chicago
 renovation of Cotton Exchange Building, Dallas
 Shady Oaks Country Club, Fort Worth
 office building, San Jose
 office building, El Paso
 office building, Phoenix
 First National Bank of Omaha
 Bank of Commerce, Abilene
 First National-Pioneer Building, Lubbock

References

20th-century American architects